The Carol Weymuller Open 2012 is the women's edition of the 2012 Carol Weymuller Open, which is a tournament of the WSA World Tour event Gold (Prize money: $50,000). The event took place at The Heights Casino in Brooklyn, New York in the United States from 27 September to 30 September. Laura Massaro won her first Carol Weymuller Open trophy, beating Raneem El Weleily in the final.

Prize money and ranking points
For 2012, the prize purse was $50,000. The prize money and points breakdown is as follows:

Seeds

Draw and results

See also
WSA World Tour 2012
Carol Weymuller Open

References

External links
WSA Carol Weymuller Open 2012 website
WISPA Carol Weymuller Open 2012 website

Carol Weymuller Open
Carol Weymuller Open
Carol Weymuller Open